Rafael Díaz or Rafael Diaz may refer to

 Rafael Díaz (baseball)
 Rafael Díaz (cyclist), born 1972.
 Rafael Díaz (footballer)
 Rafael Diaz (character), character from Star vs. the Forces of Evil

See also 
 Raphael Diaz, Swiss ice hockey defenseman.
 Raphaël Diaz, French gymnast